Major Brian R. Chontosh (born 1974 in Rochester, New York) is a retired United States Marine Corps officer who was awarded the Navy Cross for his heroic actions during the 2003 Invasion of Iraq. At the time, he was a platoon commander for Weapons Company, 3rd Battalion, 5th Marines, 1st Marine Division.

Heroism & career
On March 25, 2003, during an ambush while advancing upon Baghdad, Chontosh aggressively attacked an entrenched enemy position, resorting to using captured enemy weaponry when his M16 ran out of ammunition. He is reported to have killed at least 20 enemy soldiers during the incident.

Chontosh returned to Iraq during the second half of 2004 as the company commander of India Company, 3rd Battalion, 5th Marines. During this time his company took part in Operation Phantom Fury, the second assault on Fallujah in November 2004. Of the 158 Marines he commanded, only 3 were killed in action and 25 were wounded. During this time his company was also the focus of a Fox News documentary titled Breaking Point: Company of Heroes.

He also served as the 8th Company Officer at the United States Naval Academy and the Officer Rep for the Naval Academy Women's Ice Hockey Team (2011-2013)

There have been some news articles on the perceived lack of coverage that was awarded to this and other medal ceremonies. The controversy over the coverage or lack of coverage of Chontosh and several other servicemen is seen by the conservative political and some media as the latest cultural clash between pro-military and anti-war political camps.

Navy Cross citation

The President of the United States
Takes Pleasure in Presenting
The Navy Cross
To

Brian R. Chontosh
First Lieutenant, United States Marine Corps

For Services as Set Forth in the Following Citation:
For extraordinary heroism as Combined Anti-Armor Platoon Commander, Weapons Company, 3rd Battalion, 5th Marines, 1st Marine Division, I Marine Expeditionary Force in support of Operation IRAQI FREEDOM on 25 March 2003. While leading his platoon north on Highway I toward Ad Diwaniyah, First Lieutenant Chontosh's platoon moved into a coordinated ambush of mortars, rocket propelled grenades, and automatic weapons fire. With coalition tanks blocking the road ahead, he realized his platoon was caught in a kill zone.

He had his driver move the vehicle through a breach along his flank, where he was immediately taken under fire from an entrenched machine gun. Without hesitation, First Lieutenant Chontosh ordered the driver to advance directly at the enemy position enabling his .50 caliber machine gunner to silence the enemy.

He then directed his driver into the enemy trench, where he exited his vehicle and began to clear the trench with an M16A2 service rifle and 9 millimeter pistol. His ammunition depleted, First Lieutenant Chontosh, with complete disregard for his safety, twice picked up discarded enemy rifles and continued his ferocious attack.

When a Marine following him found an enemy rocket propelled grenade launcher, First Lieutenant Chontosh used it to destroy yet another group of enemy soldiers. When his audacious attack ended, he had cleared over 200 meters of the enemy trench, killing more than 20 enemy soldiers and wounding several others.

By his outstanding display of decisive leadership, unlimited courage in the face of heavy enemy fire, and utmost devotion to duty, First Lieutenant Chontosh reflected great credit upon himself and upheld the highest traditions of the Marine Corps and the United States Naval Service.

Honors
 Chontosh, a 2000 graduate of Rochester Institute of Technology (RIT) was honored as RIT's 2005 Outstanding Alumnus.
Honorary graduate of the United States Naval Academy, Class of 2006.
On September 21, 2006, at the annual Keeper of the Flame dinner, Captain Chontosh was honored by Chairman of the Joint Chiefs of Staff General Peter Pace for his actions in March 2003.

Big Fish Foundation 
On January 1, 2020, Brian Chontosh conceptualized and founded the Big Fish Foundation (BFF), an organization with a mission "to enhance Veteran’s lives by reconnecting them to fundamental principles of service in order to reemphasize accountability towards each other through shared common purpose in a campaign to improve psychological wellness, effectively manage post traumatic/combat stress, and prevent suicide."  The Big Fish Foundation became an official 501(c)(3) non-profit organization in 2021. Each year, the BFF hosts its annual fundraiser at the Crooked Butterfly Ranch outside of Boulder, CO.

Other
 Brian Chontosh placed 2nd in the SoCal Regional Qualifiers for the 2009 CrossFit Games. The Games were held July 10-12, 2009 in Aromas, CA.

See also

Operation Phantom Fury

References

External links

Company of Heroes from Fox News
BIG FISH FOUNDATION

1974 births
Living people
United States Marine Corps personnel of the Iraq War
Recipients of the Navy Cross (United States)
Military personnel from Rochester, New York
United States Marine Corps officers
Rochester Institute of Technology alumni
CrossFit athletes